Kalamb is a town with a municipal council in Osmanabad district in the Indian state of Maharashtra. Administratively it is part of and headquarters for the Kalamb Tehsil.

Geography
Kalamb is located on the right (south) bank of the Manjara River, just west of the Manjara Dam Reservoir.

Demographics
In the 2011 India census, Kalamb had a population of 217,687 name="PF-2001-Census-Kalamb"></ref> Males constituted 52.6% of the population and females 47.4%. Kalamb had an average literacy rate of 73.7%, higher than the national average of 64%: male literacy was 78%, and female literacy was 68%. In 2011 in Kalamb, 13.7% of the population was under 6 years of age.

See also

 Beed
 Maharashtra
 Sonesangavi
 Osmanabad
 Latur

References

Cities and towns in Osmanabad district
Talukas in Maharashtra